Billen Ted is a British record production and songwriting duo based in London, consisting of Tom Hollings and Sam Brennan.

History

They gained notoriety with the single "Satisfied" sampling from the Chaka Khan 1984 hit "I Feel for You". However their status was further raised with their remix of a sea shanty song "Wellerman" that had gone viral by the British singer Nathan Evans. The 220 Kid x Billen Ted Remix of the song topped the UK Singles Chart in March 2021, and charted in other countries.

Clients

As a record producer, Billen Ted have helped produce records for a number of other artists, including 220 Kid, Becky Hill, MNEK, LANY, Rain Radio, RAYE, S1mba, Melanie C and Gracey.

Discography

Singles
2020: "Satisfied"
2021: "Got You Covered" with Gracey
2021: "When You're Out" featuring Mae Muller
2022: "24/7" featuring JC Stewart
2022: "Come Around Again" with Armin van Buuren featuring JC Stewart

Remixes

References

British record production teams
English musical duos
Record production duos
British songwriting teams